The Bendigo Gold Football Club was an Australian rules football club based in Bendigo, Victoria, Australia. The club played in the Victorian Football League (VFL) from 1998 until 2014, under the nicknames Diggers, Bombers and Gold at different times. The club disbanded at the conclusion of the 2014 VFL season.

History
The club entered the VFL in 1998 as the Bendigo Diggers. It struggled for on-field success, winning only seven games in its first three seasons, and enduring successive winless seasons in 2001 and 2002.

Starting from 2003 the club formed an affiliation with the Essendon Football Club in the Australian Football League, under which Essendon could field its reserves players in the Bendigo team. The Diggers mascot was changed to the Bendigo Bombers and the guernsey changed to black with a red sash, to match those of the Essendon AFL club. Over the following ten years of the clubs' affiliation, the club played finals five times, with its best finish and sole finals victory coming in 2005, when the club finished fourth. The club also endured another winless season during the affiliation, in 2009.

After the completion of the 2011 season, Essendon announced that the 2012 season would be the last season of affiliation with Bendigo; Essendon fielded a stand-alone reserves team in the VFL from 2013, and Bendigo returned to fielding a stand-alone senior team. To reflect the impending change, the team changed its name to the Bendigo Gold, starting in 2012 (the final season of the clubs' affiliation).

Without access to the professional players or financial support offered by its affiliation with Essendon, Bendigo quickly struggled to remain competitive as a stand-alone club. Bendigo was winless in both 2013 and 2014 – which, when added to the 2001 and 2002 seasons, represented four consecutive winless seasons as a stand-alone club. In June 2014, the club concluded that it was not financially viable in the long term; it consequently disbanded and left the VFL following the 2014 season.

Honour board

References

External links

Official website (Archive, 15 Aug 2012)

Former Victorian Football League clubs
Sport in Bendigo
1998 establishments in Australia
2014 disestablishments in Australia
Bendigo
Australian rules football clubs established in 1998
Sports clubs disestablished in 2014